Glenferrie railway station is located on the Lilydale, Belgrave and Alamein lines in Victoria, Australia. It serves the eastern Melbourne suburb of Hawthorn, and it opened on 3 April 1882 as Glenferrie Road. It was renamed Glenferrie on 1 September of that year.

The station serves the nearby Hawthorn campus of Swinburne University of Technology, and is listed on the Victorian Heritage Register.

History

Glenferrie station opened on 3 April 1882, when the railway line from Hawthorn was extended to Camberwell. The station is named after nearby Glenferrie Road, itself named after a property which was purchased by solicitor Peter Ferrie in 1840, who later named the property Glen Ferrie.

In 1963, a third line was provided between Hawthorn and Camberwell. These works included a new Up platform (Platform 1), with Platform 2 becoming a bi-directional platform.

On 26 February 1996, Glenferrie was upgraded to a Premium Station.

Platforms and services

Glenferrie has one island platform with two faces, and one side platform. It is serviced by Metro Trains' Lilydale, Belgrave and Alamein line services.

Platform 1:
  weekday all stations and limited express services to Flinders Street
  all stations and limited express services to Flinders Street
  all stations and limited express services to Flinders Street

Platform 2:
  weekend all stations services to Lilydale
  weekend all stations services to Belgrave
  weekday peak hour all stations and limited express services to Flinders Street. Off-peak services operate express past this platform.
  weekday peak hour all stations and limited express services to Flinders Street. Off-peak services operate express past this platform.

Platform 3:
  weekday all stations and limited express services to Lilydale; weekday all stations and limited express services to Blackburn
  weekday all stations and limited express services to Belgrave; weekday all stations and limited express services to Blackburn
  weekday all stations services to Alamein

Transport links

Yarra Trams operates one route via Glenferrie station:
 : Melbourne University – Kew

Gallery

References

External links

 Melway map at street-directory.com.au

Heritage-listed buildings in Melbourne
Listed railway stations in Australia
Premium Melbourne railway stations
Railway stations in Australia opened in 1882
Railway stations in Melbourne
Railway stations in the City of Boroondara